Francis Joseph Shacklock (22 September 1861 – 1 May 1937) was an English cricketer who played first-class cricket for Nottinghamshire in 1883 and between 1886 and 1893, for Derbyshire in 1884 and 1885, for MCC between 1889 and 1893 and for Otago in New Zealand from 1903 to 1905. Shacklock may have been the inspiration for the naming of Arthur Conan Doyle's character Sherlock Holmes.

Shacklock was born at Crich, Derbyshire, and by 1881 was a professional cricketer living in Kirkby in Ashfield, Nottinghamshire. He made his first-class debut for Nottinghamshire in September 1883 against MCC when he took a wicket in the first innings and four in the second innings but failed to score a run.

Shacklock joined Derbyshire in the 1884 season and played regularly. In the 1885 season against Yorkshire in August he took 8 for 45 in the first innings, and 5 for 87 in the second innings of the same match. He shared the top wicket tally for the season with William Cropper. Shacklock took 59 wickets for Derbyshire at an average of 16.74 and a best performance of 8 for 45.

In 1886 Shacklock rejoined Nottinghamshire and played 117 matches for them over the next eight years. For Nottinghamshire he took 360 wickets at an average of 18.74 and a best performance of 8 for 32. After 1889 Shacklock played for the MCC against the universities and also for sides selected by Nottinghamshire wicketkeeper Mordecai Sherwin.

In 1903 Shacklock moved to New Zealand where he coached in Dunedin and played for Otago. He remained in New Zealand and moved to Christchurch, where he was the principal coach to the Canterbury Cricket Association in the early 1920s. He died in Christchurch in 1937.

The name of Arthur Conan Doyle's most famous character, Sherlock Holmes, is said to have been inspired by the combination of Shacklock and Sherwin. His fellow fast bowler at Derbyshire was William Mycroft and the pair Shacklock and Mycroft were prominent in a match against MCC at Lord's in June 1885. Conan Doyle, who was an active MCC member, published his first Sherlock Holmes story two years later. Holmes' brother in the stories was named Mycroft.

References

External links

1861 births
1937 deaths
English cricketers
Nottinghamshire cricketers
Derbyshire cricketers
Otago cricketers
Marylebone Cricket Club cricketers
North v South cricketers
Players cricketers
People from Kirkby-in-Ashfield
Cricketers from Nottinghamshire
New Zealand cricket coaches
H. Philipson's XI cricketers
South Island cricketers